Pindara illibata is a moth of the family Noctuidae first described by Johan Christian Fabricius in 1775. It is found in the Oriental region, including Taiwan, China, India, Sri Lanka, Myanmar, Japan and Borneo.

Description
Its wingspan is about 72 mm. A pale rufous moth. Forewings with short sub-basal and oblique antemedial medial dark lines on pale reddish bands. Renifrom large with a dark line in it. Three indistinct waved postmedial line found on pale reddish suffusion and one sub-marginal line present. A large semi-circular patch with white edges at apex. Abdomen and hindwings fuscous brown, where hindwings with indistinct pale medial line. The margin except at apex is greyish.

The larvae feed on Bischofia and Elaeocarpus species.

References

Catocalinae
Moths of Asia
Moths of Japan
Moths of Sri Lanka